The No Parking Meters Party is a minor Australian political party. The party was registered from 2006 to 2013 with the New South Wales Electoral Commission to contest state and local council elections, and has done so.

Founding and policy 
The party was founded in February 2006 as a single-issue party, seeing parking meters as "an extra tax on the family car". However, they now have broader policies: opposing tolls, pokie taxes, and red tape, among others. The party supports the proposal by Randwick councillor and party member Charles Matthews to impose a $50 registration fee on bicycle riders, which would be used to help fund cycleways being built by the council. This proposal was rejected by other councillors.

Representation 
The party has a representative on the City of Randwick, its founder, Charles Matthews. Matthews served on the Randwick council from 1977 to 2004, and was again elected in 2008. He served as the city's first mayor following its incorporation from 1990 to 1991. It contested the 2011 New South Wales state election.

Deregistration
In 2013 the Australian Electoral Commission deregistered No Parking Meters Party for having fewer than 500 members, the required amount for a political party in Australia. A review request by the party with a new member list was rejected after 2 of the 18 alleged members were randomly contacted by the AEC and denied being members of the party.

References

External links 
 
ABC Elections- Randwick
ElectionLeaflets
Afternoons with Carol Duncan interview
Crikey coverage
'Souths star Craig Wing plots switch to politics'

Defunct political parties in Australia
Single-issue political parties
Parking
Road transport in Australia